Iris Eliisa Rauskala (born 14 March 1978 in Helsinki) is a Finnish-born Austrian civil servant and economist who served as Minister of Education, Science and Research in the Bierlein government.

Life 
The daughter of a Finnish scientist and an Austrian civil servant, Rauskala was born in Helsinki, where she lived until the age of five. She is married and openly lesbian.

She studied international economics at the University of Innsbruck and completed a doctorate in 2006. She taught at the Zurich University of Applied Sciences from 2011 until she was appointed to a highly ranked position in the education ministry in 2015. She is deputy chairperson of the Austrian Science Fund board of supervisors.

On 3 June 2019 she was sworn in as Minister for Education, Science and Research in the interim government of Brigitte Bierlein. She was described as popular and "extremely dynamic".

References

External links 
 

1978 births
Living people
Finnish emigrants to Austria
Government ministers of Austria
Women government ministers of Austria
Austrian women economists
Austrian LGBT politicians
University of Innsbruck alumni
21st-century  Austrian economists
21st-century Austrian politicians
21st-century Austrian women politicians
LGBT government ministers